The 2014–15 season was Manchester United's 23rd season in the Premier League, and their 40th consecutive season in the top-flight of English football.

United began the season on 16 August 2014, with the opening game of their Premier League campaign. They also competed in two domestic cups — the FA Cup and the League Cup. This was the first season since 1989–90 that Manchester United did not compete in any European competition having finished seventh in the last Premier League season; the club had participated in the UEFA Champions League since the 1995–96 campaign and European competitions since 1990–91.

This was United's first trophyless season since 2004–05.

Background
Louis van Gaal was announced as the new manager in May 2014 after the sacking of David Moyes in April. He appointed Ryan Giggs, who retired from playing, as assistant manager; Marcel Bout as assistant coach, specialising in oppositional scouting; and Frans Hoek as goalkeeping coach. Rio Ferdinand, Nemanja Vidić and Patrice Evra left the club. United completed their first signing of the season on 26 June 2014 with the acquisition of Ander Herrera from Athletic Bilbao for £29 million, and followed this up the following day with Luke Shaw from Southampton. Following the departures of Vidić and Evra, Wayne Rooney and Darren Fletcher were named as captain and vice-captain respectively.

Pre-season and friendlies
Manchester United preceded their 2014–15 campaign with a tour of the United States. They played LA Galaxy in the Chevrolet Cup on 23 July, and also participated in the 2014 International Champions Cup from 26 July to 2 August, playing against Roma, Internazionale and Real Madrid in the group stage. The match against Real Madrid on 2 August set a US attendance record of 109,318. Having beaten Roma and Real Madrid in normal time, and Internazionale on penalties to win their group, they qualified for the final against Liverpool on 4 August. After going behind to a Steven Gerrard penalty in the first half, United rallied in the second with goals from Wayne Rooney, Juan Mata and Jesse Lingard to win 3–1. Upon their return to England, the team played against Valencia on 12 August in what was Louis van Gaal's first home match as Manchester United manager.

Premier League

The fixtures for the 2014–15 league season were announced on 18 June 2014. Manchester United opened their Premier League campaign at home to Swansea City on 16 August 2014, and their last game of the season was away to Hull City on 24 May 2015. The season started off on the wrong foot for Manchester United, losing 2–1 at home to Swansea City, marking Swansea's first league win at Old Trafford in club history and the Red Devils first home loss in a season opener since 1972. Juan Mata gave United the lead away at Sunderland but Jack Rodwell equalised on his debut, meaning the match finished as a draw, before United ended August with a laboured 0–0 draw against Burnley, despite Ángel Di María making his debut for the Red Devils.

The draw was followed up with United's first win of the season, a 4–0 thumping of Queens Park Rangers. However, the following week, 2–0 and 3–1 leads were blown as the Red Devils suffered a remarkable 5–3 defeat away to Leicester City. September concluded with a nervy 2–1 home win over West Ham United despite captain Wayne Rooney's sending-off for a reckless kick at the legs of Stewart Downing.

The next fixture, without club captain Rooney, was a morale-boosting 2–1 home victory over Everton, who had achieved the league double over United the previous season. Radamel Falcao netted the winner with his first goal for United. The next two matches were last-minute draws against West Bromwich Albion and league leaders Chelsea, respectively.

A United side which was severely depleted in defence then narrowly lost to city rivals Manchester City on 2 November, with Sergio Agüero's goal separating the teams at the Etihad Stadium. The next match, a 1–0 victory over Crystal Palace courtesy of a Juan Mata strike, ignited a six-match winning run that took United to third place in the table. Although United recorded wins over Premier League giants Arsenal, Liverpool and in-form Southampton, they were greatly indebted to Spanish goalkeeper David de Gea, who made many game-saving stops. United then drew away to Aston Villa, with new signing Falcao scoring his second goal for the club. The Boxing Day clash against Newcastle at Old Trafford was a 3–1 win, with Wayne Rooney scoring twice and assisting a goal for Robin van Persie.

The next game, only two days later, was a goalless draw away to Tottenham Hotspur. The result was the same against Stoke on New Year's Day, with Falcao's goal unable to win the game in a 1–1 draw. The following match, United ended their unbeaten streak with a home defeat to Southampton — the first time the Saints had won at Old Trafford in 27 years. Next week, United secured a 2–0 win against QPR at Loftus Road, with Marouane Fellaini and James Wilson scoring. On 31 January United beat Leicester City 3–1 at Old Trafford with goals from Van Persie and Falcao, thus gaining a measure of revenge for their early-season mauling at the King Power Stadium.

United had to claw back a 1–1 draw at Upton Park against West Ham on February 8 thanks to an equaliser in stoppage time from Daley Blind. After this, United won 3–1 against Burnley at Old Trafford, with two goals in the first half from substitute Chris Smalling, and a late penalty from Van Persie, although the Red Devils''' performance was far from their best. On 21 February, United suffered their first away defeat since November as Swansea did the double on the Red Devils for the first time in their history, winning 2–1, resulting in United dropping to fourth place. United got back to winning ways with a 2–0 home victory over Sunderland, which was followed by a 1–0 away victory against Newcastle United on 4 March, the winner coming from Ashley Young after a late defensive error from Newcastle.

The following fixture, United secured a storming 3–0 home victory over Tottenham Hotspur to boost their chances of a top four finish. Their next game was against arch-rivals Liverpool at Anfield. United won the match courtesy of a brace from Juan Mata to secure the double over their rivals.

After the international break, United's next opponents were league strugglers Aston Villa at Old Trafford on 4 April 2015. United won the match 3–1 with a brace from Ander Herrera and a goal from Wayne Rooney to move up to third in the Premier League table. On 12 April 2015, United claimed their first Manchester derby win since 2012 over neighbours Manchester City – a stunning 4–2 victory with goals from Young, Fellaini, Mata, and Smalling. United failed to extend their winning run, and suffered their first defeat in six games to league leaders Chelsea. United then suffered their second straight defeat the following week, in a 3–0 loss to Everton. This meant the Red Devils had failed to win at Goodison Park for the third season running.

On 2 May 2015, Manchester United failed to bounce back as they suffered a 1–0 home defeat to West Bromwich Albion. It was the first time since 2001 that United lost three consecutive matches, meaning the Red Devils remained in fourth place. On 9 May 2015, United beat Crystal Palace 2–1 to end their losing run. In their penultimate game of the season on 17 May, United faced rivals Arsenal. The match ended in a 1–1 draw, ensuring the Red Devils would compete in the Champions League next season following a one-year absence. United's final match of the season against Hull City ended in a draw, relegating the Tigers, although they would have been relegated regardless of the result. Manchester United ended the season in fourth place – three places, and six points higher than the previous season.

FA Cup

United entered the FA Cup at the Third Round stage with the other Premier League clubs, as well as those from the Championship. The draw was made on 8 December 2014, which saw United drawn away at Yeovil Town from League One. The match was played on 4 January 2015, with United winning 2–0 through second-half goals from Ander Herrera and Ángel Di María. United went on to face League Two side Cambridge United in the fourth round on 23 January 2015, but the match resulted in a goalless draw. The replay took place on 3 February at Old Trafford, with Manchester United winning 3–0, after goals from Juan Mata, Marcos Rojo and James Wilson. In the fifth round, United were drawn away to Preston North End, which they won 3–1. United had to come from behind after Scott Laird opened the scoring for Preston in the 47th minute. Ander Herrera levelled the game 18 minutes later, and Marouane Fellaini put United ahead in the 72nd minute. Near the end, Wayne Rooney scored a penalty to seal a place in the sixth round, in which United were drawn in a home match to holders Arsenal, which was played on 9 March 2015. United lost the match 2–1, resulting in the Red Devils exit from the FA Cup.

League Cup

United entered the League Cup at the Second Round stage for the first time since 1995–96, the last season before teams that had qualified for European competitions were allowed to enter the competition in the Third Round instead of the Second Round. The draw took place on 13 August 2014, with United being drawn away to League One side Milton Keynes Dons. It was the first ever meeting between the clubs, since the formation of MK Dons in 2004. Manchester United were thrashed by their League One counterparts. Will Grigg scored twice to capitalise on defensive mistakes by the United back three, while substitute Benik Afobe added two further goals. It was United's earliest League Cup exit and first to a third-tier team since a 4–3 aggregate defeat to York City of the Second Division back in 1995.

Squad statisticsStatistics accurate as of match played 24 May 2015.''

Transfers

In

Out

Loan in

Loan out

Notes

References

Manchester United F.C. seasons
Manchester United